James Logan High School  (also known as JLHS or Logan) is a public high school located in Union City, California. It is part of the New Haven Unified School District in the San Francisco Bay Area.

Awards
In 1994 and 1998, Logan was recognized as a California Distinguished School by the California Department of Education.  Logan was recognized in 1983 and 1987 as a Blue Ribbon School by the U.S. Department of Education.

History
James Logan High School was named after pioneer James Logan, who came to Alvarado (former settlement, now part of Union City) from Derry, Ireland in 1885. After World War II, the growth of Union City was so tremendous, a new high school was built to serve that district. James Logan served on the Washington Union High School Board of Trustees for many years and had used his own farming equipment to condition the sports field at the new school, and the school was aptly named after his service and commitment to local education.

Notable alumni
 Stephen Abas - 2004 Olympic silver medalist in freestyle wrestling
 Tuineau Alipate - former CFL and NFL player
 Otis Amey - former wide receiver for the San Francisco 49ers
 Vince Amey - former NFL player
 Joey Bragg - actor on the Disney Channel show Liv and Maddie
 Darryl Byrd - former NFL player
 Dejon Gomes - defensive back for the Detroit Lions
 Vickie Guerrero - professional wrestling personality, signed to All Elite Wrestling
 Jonn Hart - R&B singer
 Cassey Ho - YouTube fitness guru
 Aaron Ledesma - Major League Baseball infielder for the New York Mets, Tampa Bay Devil Rays, Baltimore Orioles, and Colorado Rockies
 SuChin Pak - MTV News reporter
 Danielle Reyes - contestant on  CBS's Big Brother 3 (2002) and Big Brother 7: All-Stars (2006)
 Nate Robinson - Chicago Bulls player (moved (back) to Seattle before senior year)
 Robyn Rodriguez - academic and chair of Asian American Studies at UC Davis 
 David Shaw - Head Coach of Stanford Cardinal football
 Donnie Spragan - former NFL linebacker for the Miami Dolphins
 Kelli White - track and field athlete involved in the BALCO scandal
 Roy Williams - former NFL safety
 Nahshon Wright - NFL player

References

External links
http://jameslogan.org/
New Haven Unified School District

High schools in Alameda County, California
Public high schools in California
Educational institutions established in 1959
1959 establishments in California